XtremPC was a computer magazine from Romania founded in 1998. XtremPC included previews and reviews on computer hardware, software, PC games and gadgets as well as IT news. Although its major focus was on personal computers only, latter editions started including sections dedicated to game consoles as well. XtremPC was the first Romanian magazine to include a DVD in 2004, followed two years later by LeveL. The last issue of XtremPC was the May 2010 issue (No. 120), which appeared on 3 June 2010. The further issuing of the magazine temporarily ended as a result of a drop in the number of readers.

Format 
XtremPC included four main sections:
 IT Express – news and articles regarding the latest innovations in the IT world;
 Hardware – news, previews, reviews, tests and comparison charts of computer hardware;
 Software & Communication – news, reviews and tests on computer software and communication and multimedia devices;
 Jocuri (Games) – news and reviews on PC games; later included console games as well.

Editions 
The latter issues of the magazine were available in three editions based on the type of digital media that they included:

 XtremPC (key-coloured in  green) – included the magazine only, priced at 5.9 lei (approx US$2)
 XtremPC CD (key-coloured in  orange) – included the magazine as well as a Compact Disc, priced at 7.9 lei (approx US$2.6)
 XtremPC DVD (key-coloured in  blue) – included the magazine as well as a DVD, priced at 12.9 lei (approx US$4.2)

Presently, all three editions of XtremPC are out of print and the website has been shut down. However, the forum is still active and there also is a fan site that holds the pdf versions of the magazine.

References

External links
 
       Revista XtremPC se inchide – 2 Mai
 site-ul revistei xtrempc se inchide – 1 Iulie
 XtremPC se inchide, raman cu Itfiles
 La revedere XtremPC!

Defunct computer magazines
Defunct magazines published in Romania
Magazines established in 1998
Magazines disestablished in 2010
Science and technology in Romania
1998 establishments in Romania
2010 disestablishments in Romania
Romanian-language magazines